Year 1317 (MCCCXVII) was a common year starting on Saturday (link will display the full calendar) of the Julian calendar.

Events 
 By place 

 Europe 
 January 9 – The 23-year-old Philip V (the Tall) is hastily crowned at Rheims after the death of his nephew John I (the Posthumous), as king of France (and Philip II as ruler of Navarre). There are demonstrations in Artois, Champagne and Burgundy. The coronation of Philip, instead of his niece Joan II, eldest daughter of his brother Louis X (the Quarrelsome), sets the precedent for the French royal succession (known as the Salic law).Wagner, John. A. (2006). Encyclopedia of the Hundred Years War, p. 250. Westport: Greenwood Press. 
 Philip V (the Tall) reorganizes the French army by extending the military obligations of the realm. Each town and castellany is responsible for providing a specified number of fully equipped troops – such as sergeants and infantry militias, while towns in economically advanced areas like Flanders become a major source of men and money. At the same time, the arriére ban (military recruitment) is generally commuted in favour for taxation.
 November 25 – Treaty of Templin: After ending the war between the Margraviate of Brandenburg and Denmark, Brandenburg is forced to negotiate a truce. King Eric VI, his ally Duke Henry II (the Lion) and Waldemar the Great sign a peace treaty in Templin. Brandenburg agrees to transfer Burg Stargard and Arnsberg castle to Mecklenburg. They also surrender the territories of Schlawe-Stolp, located on the Baltic coast, to Pomerania.Siegfried Schwanz (2002). Kleinzerlang 1752–2002, p. 15. Edition Rieger. .
 December 10–11 – King Birger Magnusson has his brothers, Duke's Eric Magnusson and Valdemar Magnusson, captured and thrown into a dungeon during the Nyköping Banquet – as a revenge for their imprisonment of him in the Håtuna games (see 1306). As the brothers soon starve to death in the dungeon, their followers rebel against Birger, throwing Sweden into civil war.
 A Hungarian document mentions for the first time Basarab I as leader of Wallachia (historians estimate he was on the throne since about 1310). Basarab will become the first voivode of Wallachia as an independent state, and founder of the House of Basarab (until 1352).

 By topic 

 Catastrophe 
 The Great Famine of 1315–1317 comes to an end. Crop harvests return to normal – but it will be another five years before food supplies are completely replenished in Northern Europe. Simultaneously, the people are so weakened by diseases such as pneumonia, bronchitis, and tuberculosis. Historians debate the toll, but it is estimated that 10–25% of the population of many cities and towns dies.

 Religion 
 March 31 – Pope John XXII claims imperial rights of government in Italy for the papacy. He erects the dioceses of Luçon, Maillezais, and Tulle and issues the decretal Spondent Pariter prohibiting alchemy.
 April – John XXII orders the Spiritual Franciscans, including the French priest Bernard Délicieux, to come to Avignon and answer for their disobedience. Upon arrival, Délicieux is arrested and interrogated.

Births 
 March 21 – Isabel de Verdun, English noblewoman (House of Clare) (d. 1349)
 date unknown
 Blanche of Valois, queen consort of Germany and Bohemia (d. 1348)
 Euphemia of Sweden, Swedish noblewoman and princess (d. 1370)
 Coloman, Hungarian nobleman, prince, prelate and bishop (d. 1375)
 Godfrey de Foljambe, English nobleman and Chief Justice (d. 1376)
 Ichijō Tsunemichi, Japanese nobleman (kugyō) and regent (d. 1365)
 John II, Sicilian nobleman and prince (House of Barcelona) (d. 1348)
 Michael Szécsényi, Hungarian nobleman, cleric and bishop (d. 1377) 
 Ralph de Spigurnell, English nobleman, knight and admiral (d. 1373)
 Vuk Kosača, Bosnian nobleman (knyaz), magnate and ruler (d. 1359)

Deaths 
 February 6 – Brinolfo Algotsson, Swedish bishop and theologian (b. 1240)
 February 7 – Robert de Clermont, French nobleman and prince (b. 1256)
 February 11 – Ralph Fitzwilliam, English nobleman and knight (b. 1256)
 April 6 – Guy IV, French nobleman and Grand Butler (House of Châtillon)
 April 19 – Nitchō, Japanese Buddhist monk, cleric and scholar (b. 1252)
 April 20 – Agnes of Montepulciano, Italian prioress and saint (b. 1268)
 May 23 – Guy of Avesnes, French bishop (House of Avesnes) (b. 1253) 
 June 23 – Thawun Gyi, Burmese founder and ruler of Toungoo (b. 1258)
 June 25 – Henry of Harclay, English philosopher and chancellor (b. 1270)
 August 14 – Bernard de Castanet, French diplomat and bishop (b. 1240)
 September 21 – Viola of Teschen, queen consort of Bohemia and Poland 
 October 8 – Fushimi, Japanese emperor and calligrapher (b. 1265)
 October 26 – Alice of Hainault, French noblewoman (House of Avesnes) 
 November 9 – Manfred of Sicily, Sicilian nobleman and prince (b. 1306) 
 November 13 – Yahballaha III, Turkic patriarch of the Church of the East 
 November 28 – Yishan Yining, Chinese monk and calligrapher (b. 1247)
 December 15 – Maria of Bytom, queen consort of Hungary and Croatia
 December 24 – Jean de Joinville, French historian and writer (b. 1224)
 date unknown
 Dujam II, Croatian nobleman and oligarch (House of Frankopan)
 Gerard of Bologna, Italian Carmelite theologian and philosopher
 Guillemette of Neufchâtel, Swiss noblewoman (suo jure) (b. 1260)
 Irene of Montferrat (Violante), Byzantine empress consort (b. 1274)
 John I Orsini, Latin nobleman, knight and ruler (House of Orsini)
 John V (the Illustrious), German nobleman and knight (b. 1302)
 Malise III of Strathearn, Scottish nobleman and politician (b. 1257)
 Parsoma (the Naked), Egyptian Coptic hermit and saint (b. 1257)
 Ram Khamhaeng (the Great), Tai ruler of Sukhothai (b. 1239)
 Robert of Burgundy, French nobleman and knight (b. 1300)
 Roger Brabazon, English lawyer and Chief Justice (b. 1247)
 Stephen de Dunnideer (or Donydoir), English bishop-elect
 Tolberto III, Italian nobleman (House of Caminesi) (b. 1263)
 Wolfert II van Borselen, Dutch nobleman and knight (b. 1280)

References